Toby Buonagurio is a US artist known for her "flamboyant" ceramics. She has won the  Bronx Recognizes Its Own Award (BRIO) and the SUNY award.

Professional work
Buonagurio has had her work in many exhibitions and has a permanent installation in the 42nd Street Times Square subway station. Titled "Times Square Times: 35 Times" it is made up of 35 separate pieces embedded in a glass brick wall. Buonagurio teaches art at the State University of New York at Stony Brook.

Personal life
Buonagurio comes from a working-class background in New York City's borough of the Bronx. She continues to live there and is reported to take pride in her connection to the neighborhood. She is married to the painter Edgar Buonagurio.

Awards
 1992 BRIO award
 SUNY Research Foundation Research and Scholarship award
 1998 BRIO award

References

External links
 Museum Cast podcast "Times Square-42nd Street - Art by Toby Buonagurio" January 5, 2010 (If you can't see the full titles, choose the listing whose description starts "When you think of times Square...)
 Arts for Transit podcast

Artists from the Bronx
Living people
20th-century American women artists
Year of birth missing (living people)
21st-century American women